The Palestinian Ambassador to the United Nations is the leader of the Palestinian delegation to the United Nations. The position is more formally known as the "Permanent Observer Mission of the State of Palestine to the United Nations;" however, both the title of Ambassador and "Permanent Observer" is used.  The Permanent Observer, currently Riyad Mansour, is charged with representing the State of Palestine to the United Nations.

History
In November 1974, the PLO was recognized as competent on all matters concerning the question of Palestine by the UN General Assembly granting them observer status as a "non-state entity" at the UN. After the 1988 Declaration of Independence, the UN General Assembly officially "acknowledged" the proclamation and decided to use the designation "Palestine" instead of "Palestine Liberation Organization" in the UN.

On 29 November 2012, in a 138-9 vote (with 41 abstentions and 5 absences), the United Nations General Assembly passed resolution 67/19, upgrading the status of Palestinian delegation within the United Nations system from an "observer entity" to a "non-member observer state", which was described as recognition of the PLO's sovereignty.

The UN has permitted the State of Palestine to title its representative office to the UN as "The Permanent Observer Mission of the State of Palestine to the United Nations", and Palestine has instructed its diplomats to officially represent "The State of Palestine"—no longer the Palestinian National Authority.

On 17 December 2012, UN Chief of Protocol Yeocheol Yoon declared that "the designation of 'State of Palestine' shall be used by the Secretariat in all official United Nations documents", thus recognising the title 'State of Palestine' as the state's official name for all UN purposes.  of the  member states of the United Nations have recognised the State of Palestine.

Office holders
The following is a chronological list of those who have held the office:

See also

 Foreign relations of the Palestine Liberation Organization
 International recognition of the State of Palestine
 Palestinian government

References

External links
 Official website

 
Palestine and the United Nations